The 2011 Pan-American Volleyball Cup was the sixth edition of the annual men's volleyball tournament, played by ten countries over June 13 – 18, 2011 in Gatineau, Quebec, Canada. The event served as a qualifier for the 2012 FIVB World League qualification.

Brazil won the tournament after beating the United States 3–2 in the final.

Competing nations

Squads

Preliminary round

Group A

|}

Group B

|}

Group C

|}

Final round

Championship bracket

5th–10th places bracket

Classification 5–10

Quarterfinals

Classification 9–10

Classification 5–8

Semifinals

Classification 7–8

Classification 5–6

Classification 3–4

Final

Final standing

Canada qualified for the 2012 FIVB World League qualification.

Awards
MVP:  Paulo Victor Silva
Best Scorer:  Gavin Schmitt
Best Spiker:  Gavin Schmitt
Best Blocker:  Byron Ferguson
Best Server:  Pedro Luis García
Best Digger:  Lucas Provenzano
Best Setter:  Raphael Margarido
Best Receiver:  Thiago Sens
Best Libero:  Jose Mulero

References

External links
 

Men's Pan-American Volleyball Cup
P
V
Men's Pan-American Volleyball Cup
Volleyball